= Social Stratification Research Seminar =

The Social Stratification Research Seminar (UK) is an annual research colloquium for original, empirically informed sociological presentations on social stratification. The Social Stratification Research Seminars have been running almost every autumn since 1968. The seminars have mainly been hosted at the University of Cambridge and were often organised by the Social Science Research Group (formerly the Sociological Research Group). The seminars have also been held at the Cardiff University (2003-5), the University of Edinburgh (2014, 2017), the University of Milan (2015), the University of Stirling (2007, 2011) and Utrecht University (2010).

The seminar was originally founded by - Professor Robert Blackburn, Professor Ken Prandy, and Professor Alexander Stewart. Since the early 2000s the seminar has been organised by Professor Paul Lambert, who is Professor of Sociology at the University of Stirling. The annual call for papers is usually issued in the spring and the seminar is usually held on two consecutive days in the early September. Proposals for papers for presentations are invited from any area of research into social stratification and social inequality. The organizers do not usually limit the number of delegates attending. There are no parallel sessions and therefore there is an upper limit on the number of paper presentations that can be accommodated.

A feature of the seminars has been how to appropriately measure social stratification in contemporary societies. An approach has been developed by researchers who are regular contributors to the seminars are Social Interaction and Stratification Scales.
